Andrew Jonathan Nok, NNOM (11 February 1962 – 21 November 2017) was a Nigerian Professor of Biochemistry and the public affairs secretary of the Nigerian Academy of Science. In 2010 he was a recipient of the Nigerian National Order of Merit Award (NNOM), in the Science category and in 2013 he won the Alexander Humboldt Prize. He died on 21st November 2017 after a brief illness.

Early life
Nok was born on 11 February 1962 in Kaduna State, Northern Nigeria.
His parents were from Nok village in the Jaba Local Government Area of Kaduna State. He attended the LEA Primary School in Kaduna before he proceeded to  Government Secondary School, Kafanchan where he obtained the West African School Certificate in 1979, the same year he was admitted into Ahmadu Bello University where he received a bachelor's degree in biochemistry in 1983, master's degree in 1988 and doctorate degree in 1993. He was married to Amina Nok and is a father of three children: Anita, Amanda and Nathan Nok.

Political career
Nok was nominated as commissioner of Health and Human services by the executive governor of Kaduna state, Mallam Nasir Ahmad el-Rufai on 29 July 2015, along with other 12 nominees.

Fellowship
Fellow, Nigerian Academy of Science
Fellow, Alexander von Humboldt Foundation 
Fellow, Japan Society for the Promotion of Science
Lady Davis Fellows
Fellow, Nigerian Society of Biochemistry and Molecular Biology (NSBMB)
Fellow, Nigerian Academy of Science (NAS)

References

1962 births
2017 deaths
Ahmadu Bello University alumni
Nigerian biochemists
Recipients of the Nigerian National Order of Merit Award
People from Kaduna State